Lee Hee-joon  (born June 29, 1979) is a South Korean actor.

Personal life
Lee Hee-joon and model Lee Hye-jung confirmed their relationship in August 2015. They registered their marriage prior to the ceremony and had their private wedding ceremony in a wedding hall in Yongsan, Seoul on April 23, 2016.

Filmography

Film

Television series

Web series

Theater

Play
Oedipus  (1999-2000)
관광지대 (1999-2000)
Come and See Me  (2005)
모두 안녕하십니까? (2005)
Silence  (2006)
Byeonsangdo Team  (2007)
Hongdongji nori  (2007)
Melodrama  (2007)
끝방 (2008) 
Annapurna of My Heart  (2008)
우리 노래방가서... 얘기 좀 할까? (2008)
There, Chuncheon  (2009)
우리 노래방가서... 얘기 좀 할까? (2009)
Bieonso  (2010)
A Story of Old Thieves  (2011-2012)
Wedding Scandal  (2012)
Me and Grandpa  (2014)
 Then and Today (2022)

Musical
Animal Farm  (2001)
Yi  (2006)
변 (2007)
Mirror Princess Pyeonggang  (2008)
Bachelor's Vegetable Store  (2009)
Spring Awakening  (2009)
Mirror Princess Pyeonggang  (2013)

Dance
Knife  (2004)
Gangbyeonbuk-ro  (2005)

Awards and nominations

References

External links

  
 Lee Hee-jun at BH Entertainment 
 
 
 

Living people
1979 births
South Korean male film actors
South Korean male musical theatre actors
South Korean male stage actors
South Korean male television actors
Korea National University of Arts alumni
Yeungnam University alumni
21st-century South Korean male actors
Best New Actor Paeksang Arts Award (television) winners